

Events
 Hadad-nirari Iv of Assyria conquers Damascus

Births

Deaths
 Duke Wen of Qi, ruler of the state of Qi
 Pedubastis I, pharaoh

References